Tim Heatley Tector (born 7 March 2003) is an Irish cricketer. He made his Twenty20 debut on 23 February 2020, for Ireland Wolves against Namibia, during their tour to South Africa. In February 2021, Tector was part of the intake for the Cricket Ireland Academy. He made his List A debut on 1 May 2021, for Leinster Lightning in the 2021 Inter-Provincial Cup.

In September 2021, Tector was named as the captain of the Ireland under-19 cricket team for their 2022 ICC Under-19 Cricket World Cup qualification matches in Spain. In December 2021, he was named as the captain of Ireland's team for the 2022 ICC Under-19 Cricket World Cup in the West Indies.

References

External links
 

2003 births
Living people
Irish cricketers
Leinster Lightning cricketers
Place of birth missing (living people)